Henry Edward King (9 June 1832 – 5 February 1910) was a politician in colonial Queensland, Speaker of the Legislative Assembly of Queensland 1876 to 1883.

King was born in Mount Coote, Limerick, Ireland, son of John Wingfield King and his wife Alicia, née Coote.

King was member of the Legislative Assembly of Queensland for Wide Bay 12 August 1870 to 13 July 1871 and from 4 October 1871 to 12 November 1873; for Ravenswood from 9 December 1874 to 14 November 1878 and for Maryborough from 15 November 1878 to 17 August 1883. King was Secretary for Public Works and Mines in the Macalister Ministry from November 1874 to May 1876. Two months later he was chosen Speaker of the Assembly, and occupied the chair of the House till July 1883. He was an unsuccessful candidate for Maryborough at the 1888 colonial election.

King died in South Brisbane, Queensland, on 5 February 1910 and buried in Toowong Cemetery. He was survived by his wife, four sons and three daughters.

References

1832 births
1910 deaths
Members of the Queensland Legislative Assembly
Irish emigrants to colonial Australia
Speakers of the Queensland Legislative Assembly
Burials at Toowong Cemetery
19th-century Australian politicians
19th-century Australian public servants